Hebe was launched at Sunderland in 1809 as a West Indiaman. French privateers captured her in December 1811 after a strong resistance that resulted in her sustaining heavy casualties.

She first appeared in Lloyd's Register (LR) in 1809 with Richardson, master, Cheesewright, owner, and trade England–Demerara.

Captain William Brown acquired a letter of marque on 30 August 1810.

On 19 September 1811, Hebe was reloading her cargo at Tortola, having put in there in distress as she was sailing from Demerara to London. 

As Hebe continued her journey from Demerara to London, on 16 December three privateers attacked her. She was able to sink one before her attackers boarded and captured her. She suffered seven men killed and some wounded.

Her entry in the Register of Shipping (RS) for 1812 carried the annotation "CAPTURED". Lloyd's Register continued to carry her for five more years with stale data.

Citations

1809 ships
Ships built on the River Wear
Age of Sail merchant ships of England
Captured ships